This is a complete list of current members of the United States House of Representatives based on seniority. For the most part, representatives are ranked by the beginning of their terms in office. Representatives whose terms begin the same day are ranked alphabetically by last name.

How seniority is calculated 
Members of the House are arranged by the number of terms they have served, before being arranged by the beginning date of their most recent continuous service. Where members have served the same number of terms and have the same date of service, they are arranged alphabetically by last name.

Representatives who return to the House after having previously served in the House may be credited with service equal to one less than the number of terms they served. For example, Rep. Pete Sessions had previously served eleven terms, from 1997 to 2019, when he was once again elected in 2020. Instead of holding seniority with others whose terms began January 3, 2021, he was credited with ten terms, and holds seniority above all representatives whose terms began on or after January 3, 2001. When a representative has served a prior tenure of fewer than two terms (i.e., elected in a special election to fill a vacancy, so their prior tenure length measured in terms, minus one, equals less than one), they are ranked above all others whose service begins on the same day.

Benefits of seniority 
Committee leadership in the House is often associated with seniority, especially in the Democratic Caucus. The Republican leadership, in comparison with the Democratic Party, prioritizes voting records and campaign fundraising over seniority for committee leadership. Party leadership in the House is not strictly associated with seniority.

The more senior a representative is, the more likely the representative is to receive desirable committee assignments or leadership posts. Seniority also affects access to more desirable office space in the House Office Buildings.

Vacancies 
All seats in the House of Representatives are currently filled.

 : David Cicilline (D) will resign on or before June 1 to become CEO of the Rhode Island Foundation. A special election will be held on a date to be determined by Governor Dan McKee.

Current seniority list

Delegates 
Delegates are non-voting members of the United States House of Representatives.

See also
 Current members of the United States House of Representatives
 List of United States congressional districts
 List of members of the United States Congress by longevity of service
 Seniority in the United States Senate

Notes

References

External links